Pegasus Mountains is a mountain range, 16 nautical miles (30 km) long, consisting of a system of ridges and peaks broken by two passes. Located between Bertram and Ryder Glaciers and immediately east of Gurney Point on the west coast of Palmer Land, Antarctica. Named by United Kingdom Antarctic Place-Names Committee (UK-APC) after the constellation of Pegasus.

Peaks
Fomalhaut Nunatak
Mount Crooker
Mount Markab

References

Mountain ranges of Palmer Land